Lobophytum anomolum is a species of soft coral in the genus Lobophytum.

References 

Alcyoniidae